EkoPlaza is a Dutch chain of organic food supermarkets.

As of February 2018, they have 74 supermarkets.

In February 2018, they launched the "world's first plastic-free aisle" at a branch in Amsterdam.

References

External links

Supermarkets of the Netherlands
Organic food retail organizations